Yelovino is a rural locality (a village) in Kichmengskoye Rural Settlement, Kichmengsko-Gorodetsky District, Vologda Oblast, Russia. The population was 293 as of 2002. There are 8 streets.

Geography 
Yelovino is located 25 km south of Kichmengsky Gorodok (the district's administrative centre) by road. Smolyanka is the nearest rural locality.

References 

Rural localities in Kichmengsko-Gorodetsky District